The 2021 United States Mixed Doubles Curling Championship was held from May 19 to 23, 2021 at the Wausau Curling Club in Wausau, Wisconsin. The championship featured twenty four teams split into four pools of six. After the round robin, the top two teams from each pool qualified for the playoffs with the first place teams advancing to the seeding round.

In the final, the pair of Vicky Persinger and Chris Plys defeated Madison Bear and Andrew Stopera 8–5 to claim the title. It was a first mixed doubles championship for both Persinger and Plys, having finished runner–up in 2019 to the duo of Cory Christensen and John Shuster. Bear and Stopera went a perfect 7–0 in the tournament before dropping the final. To advance to the final, Persinger and Plys defeated the duo of Aileen Geving and Luc Violette 8–5 and Bear and Stopera topped Jenna Burchesky and Ben Richardson 7–2. All four teams that qualified for the semifinals qualified their teams for the 2021 United States Mixed Doubles Curling Olympic Trials which will be held in fall 2021.

Impact of the COVID-19 pandemic
The event was originally scheduled to be held February 28 to March 6, 2021 at Great Park Ice & FivePoint Arena in Irvine, California and also be the Mixed Doubles Olympic Trials for the 2022 Winter Olympics. In December, 2020, the USCA announced that all remaining 2020–21 events would be either cancelled or postponed until late spring 2021. This postponement delayed the Mixed Doubles Championship until after the 2021 World Mixed Doubles Championship and so the 2020 champions, Tabitha Peterson and Joe Polo, were selected to represent the United States. This gave the team the opportunity to compete at Worlds which they missed the previous year when the 2020 World Mixed Doubles Championship was cancelled due to the COVID-19 pandemic. On March 29, 2021 it was announced that the 2021 Mixed Doubles Championship would be held in conjunction with the Women's Nationals and Men's Nationals in a bio-secure bubble at Wausau Curling Club in Wausau, Wisconsin in May, 2021. Due to the pandemic, it was decided to separate the 2021 Mixed Doubles Olympic Trials from the National Championship and delay the trials until fall 2021.

Qualification
Due to the pandemic, no qualification events were held and the qualification methods were modified. Any team that had qualified for the 2020 United States Mixed Doubles Curling Championship qualified for the event. Then, up to twelve teams that had at least one athlete in the top fifty of the World Curling Federation's men's and women's rankings qualified. The remaining spots were selected by the top teams, not already qualified, from the WCF Mixed Doubles World Team Ranking System as of the close of registration.

Teams
The teams competing in the 2021 championship are:

Round-robin standings
Final round-robin standings

Round-robin results
All draw times are listed in Central Daylight Time (UTC−05:00).

Draw 1
Wednesday, May 19, 5:30 pm

Draw 2
Wednesday, May 19, 8:30 pm

Draw 3
Thursday, May 20, 9:00 am

Draw 4
Thursday, May 20, 12:00 pm

Draw 5
Thursday, May 20, 4:00 pm

Draw 6
Thursday, May 20, 7:00 pm

Draw 7
Friday, May 21, 9:00 am

Draw 8
Friday, May 21, 12:00 pm

Draw 9
Friday, May 21, 4:00 pm

Draw 10
Friday, May 21, 7:00 pm

Tiebreakers
Saturday, May 22, 9:00 am

Saturday, May 22, 2:00 pm

Playoffs

Seeding round
The top team in each pool qualified for the seeding round. The winners of both games qualified directly for the semifinals while the losers dropped into the quarterfinals.

Seeding games
Saturday, May 22, 7:00 pm

Championship round

Qualification games
Saturday, May 22, 7:00 pm

Quarterfinals
Sunday, May 23, 9:00 am

Semifinals
Sunday, May 23, 2:00 pm

Final
Sunday, May 23, 7:00 pm

References

United States National Curling Championships
Curling in Wisconsin
Sports in Wausau, Wisconsin
2021 in curling
2021 in sports in Wisconsin
Curling
United States 2021